The 2008 Vancouver Whitecaps season was the club's 23rd year of existence (or 33rd if counting the NASL Whitecaps), as well as their 16th as a Division 2 club in the franchise model of US-based soccer leagues. With games against well supported MLS side Toronto FC in the Voyageurs Cup and local rival Seattle Sounders selling 22,000 season tickets for MLS in 2009, the Vancouver Whitecaps were marketed as one of the leading markets for a 2011 MLS expansion side. This included expanding the ownership to include Victoria, BC raised NBA star Steve Nash in July.   The Division 1 MLS speculation along with the higher profile that came with public negotiations with Vancouver City Council and the Port of Metro Vancouver to develop the Whitecaps Waterfront Stadium gave a boost to media coverage and game attendances.  The privately financed stadium, first proposed in 2006, appeared to be reaching its final government land use approvals in 2008.

The 2008 season started in a strong fashion with two losses in their first ten games as new coach Teitur Thordarson maintained the defensive style of previous coach Bob Lilley to grind out results.  The USL-1 league was a closely contested affair with eleven points separating 11th and third in the standings.  However, the top two teams, the Whitecaps and Puerto Rico were a further ten points clear of third place.  The Commissioner's Cup was a contest between the Whitecaps, who finished runner-up by one point, and the Puerto Rico Islanders. The Whitecaps almost squandered a 5-1 aggregate league by letting the Minnesota Thunder back into the second leg of the USL-1 play in round, but held on for a 5-4 aggregate win. In the semi-final series against Montreal Impact they ground out a first leg 1-0 loss after their goal keeper was ejected.  The Whitecaps deservedly won the second leg 2-0 at home to go through 2-1 on aggregate to the final against Puerto Rico Islanders. The playoff final was a back and forth game in which the Whitecaps prevailed 2-1 in front of 5,822 at their long time home of Swangard Stadium.

This was the first year of the official tournament for the Voyageurs Cup also known as the Canadian Championship as CONCACAF designated a Canadian spot in the new champions league structure of the CONCACAF Champions Cup. The Whitecaps finished third in the 2008 Voyaguers Cup with two losses to Montreal and a draw and a win over Division 1 MLS side Toronto FC.

Schedule and results

Tables 

Tie-breaker order: 1. Head-to-head points; 2. Total wins; 3. Goal difference; 4. Goals for; 5. Lottery
† Rochester deducted 1 point for use of an ineligible player on August 10, 2008

Pre-season

USL-1

Results by round

Post-season
Play-in Round

Semi-finals

Final

Canadian Championship

Canadian Championship standings

Canadian Championship results

Cascadia Cup

Friendlies

Current roster
After the 2007 season, the Whitecaps and coach Bob Lilley parted ways with the Whitecaps hiring Teitur Thordarson. Many local long time stalwart veteran players such as Jeff Clarke, Jason Jordan, Steve Kindel, Geordie Lyall, Martin Nash, and Alfredo Valente remained on the roster. Leading striker Eduardo Sebrango also was back for another year with the new coach.

The Whitecaps signed Jamaican striker Nicholas Addlery, US keeper Jay Nolly, Omar Jarun, Japanese international Takashi Hirano, and Bolivian youth international Vicente Arze.

Staff
 Head coach – Teitur Thordarson
 Assistant coach – Todd Wawrousek
 Manager communications – Nathan Vanstone
 Director of professional teams – Greg Anderson
 Office manager – Lindsay Pucklik
 President – Bob Lenarduzzi

All stats as of the end of the season.

Goalkeeper stats

Player statistics

Updated February 28, 2014
 Note this list includes only players that have dressed in the eighteen.
 Note brackets indicate substitute appearances.
 Note statistics are for league and playoffs (not preseason). Voyageurs Cup statistics appear to no longer be available.

References

Vancouver Whitecaps (1986–2010) seasons
Vancouver Whitecaps